The Ottawa West Golden Knights are a Canadian Junior ice hockey team based in Ottawa, Ontario.  Between 2014-15 and the end of the 2019-2020 seasons, the EOJHL and the CCHL set a new agreement  in an attempt to create a better player development model. This resulted in the league re-branding itself as the Central Canada Hockey League Tier 2 (CCHL2), and shrinking to 16 teams and two divisions. The league reverted to the Eastern Ontario Junior Hockey League for 2021.  The Golden Knights are in the Martin Division.

History
From the 2001-02 season to the 2008-09 season, the Golden Knights won five league championships in eight seasons.  Their greatest challenge in this period may have been the Westport Rideaus in the 2005-06 playoffs.  The Rideaus had the Golden Knights pinned down and against the wall 3 games to 2 in the final series, but the Golden Knights battled back and took the last two nail-biters to win their fourth title.  The Golden Knights had a banner year for the 2008-2009 season by winning the D. Arnold Carson trophy for the 6th time in the team's history and its 5th league championship in 8 years. The Knights also captured the 2008 Boxing Day Tournament title.

However, by 2012-2013 the team was in a rebuild year after losing 3 Top defensemen in Neil Clarke, Mitch Fournier and Sebastien Dubus, goaltender Jacob Blair who moved on to the Ottawa 67's, and a top forward in Ben Minkus.

Season-by-season results

2017-18 staff
Head Coach -Steve Sundin
General Manager - Craig Smith
Owner - -Steve Sundin
Dir. Player Development/Head Scout - Bob Ward
Assistant Coach - Kevin Groulx
Assistant Coach - Luciano Pietrantonio
Video Coach - Brendan Deavy
Trainer - Seve Janelle
Equipment Manager - Kristine Moreau
PA/Pointstreak - Kirk Laymann

2016–17 staff
Head Coach -Steve Sundin
General Manager - Craig Smith
Owner - -Steve Sundin
Dir. Player Development/Head Scout - Bob Ward
Assistant Coach - Mike Emmerton
Assistant Coach - Luciano Pietrantonio
Assistant Coach - Mike Milito
Video Coach - Conor Mulligan
Trainer - Tammy McNamara
Equipment Manager - Kristine Moreau
Statistician - Robert Hill

Notable alumni
Luke Richardson
Paul Byron
Eric O'Dell 
Corey Foster

External links
Golden Knights Webpage
CCHL2 Webpage

Eastern Ontario Junior B Hockey League teams
Wes
Ice hockey clubs established in 1973